Startforth is a village on the Pennines end of south Teesdale, England. The population of Startforth taken at the 2011 Census was 1,361. It is historically located in the North Riding of Yorkshire, but along with the rest of the former Startforth Rural District, it was transferred to County Durham for administrative and ceremonial purposes on 1 April 1974, under the provisions of the Local Government Act 1972.

It is situated south-west of Barnard Castle, north of the River Tees.  Located in the village is Deerbolt Prison, a male juvenile's prison and Young Offenders Institution.

History
The place-name 'Startforth' is first attested circa 1050, when it appears as Stretford. It is mentioned in the Domesday Book of 1086 as Stradford. The name means 'street-ford', and refers to the paved ford by which the Roman road which passes through the village crosses the River Tees. The Roman road in question here linked the Roman forts of Bowes and Binchester. The paved ford is still visible in the bed of the river when the water is low.

Education
Startforth used to have one primary school, Startforth Morritt Memorial Church of England School, but it was closed after a vote by councillors in September 2016.

References

External links

Villages in County Durham